Magdalena Fürstin (1652–1717) was a German artist and hand-colourist. She was from Nuremberg, and was a pupil of John Fischer and Maria Sybilla Merian.

Her name appears as a plate illuminator in Basilius Besler's famous codex of the plant specimens in the Garden of Eichstatt, Hortus Eystettensis: Studien zur Entstehung des Kupferstichwerks und zum Exemplar des Andrea Vendramin (or Hortus Eystettensis: Studies on the creation of the copper engraving and the copy of Andrea Vendramin) She worked on the book for five years, and the copy she worked on is currently in the Austrian National Library in Vienna.

References 

1652 births
1717 deaths
17th-century German women artists
17th-century German women scientists
Artists from Nuremberg
18th-century German women artists
Women botanists
Botanical illustrators
Scientific illustrators
17th-century German botanists
German illustrators
18th-century German botanists
German women illustrators